The Tokai Derby (in Japanese: 名古屋優駿), is a race for three-year-olds from the Tokai region in the Aichi Prefectural Horse Racing Association.

Race Details

The race was established in 1971. It was known as the "Tokai Yugo" and had multiple name changes before becoming the "Tokai Derby".

The race was originally 1,800 meters long and briefly ran on turf.

Winners since 2014

Past winners

Past winners include:

See also
 Horse racing in Japan
 List of Japanese flat horse races

References

Horse races in Japan